Richard Coughtrie (born 1 September 1988) is an English born Scottish cricketer, a wicket-keeper-batsman who most recently played for Gloucestershire. He made his first-class debut for Oxford UCCE against Worcestershire in April 2009. Coughtrie signed a two-year contract with Gloucestershire in November 2010. Coughtrie worked as a teacher of economics at Dulwich College, London and now works at Eton College.

County career
Born 1 September 1988, North Shields, Northumberland, Coughtrie made his first-class debut for Oxford UCCE in April 2009 opening the batting scoring 4 and taking two catches in a drawn match. He made his debut for Gloucestershire after making a host of second XI appearances against Derbyshire in April 2011. He scored 20 in the first innings, however didn't keep wicket due to first option Jonathan Batty playing. Gloucestershire beat Derbyshire by seven wickets. Coughtrie scored 47 not out in 69 balls in a three-day University match against Cardiff UCCE in April 2011. Coughtrie made 45 in the first innings in a drawn match against Essex in May 2011. In August 2011, Coughtrie made his first-class top score as he made 54 not out to top score in the Gloucestershire first innings against Derbyshire in a seven wicket loss.

On 7 October 2013, it was announced that Gloucestershire were releasing Coughtrie after he played just one Twenty20 match in 2012.

International career
In September 2012 Coughtrie was called up to the Scotland squad for their tour to South Africa. Coughtrie is eligible due to his Scottish father.

Career best performances
as of 1 October 2013

References

External links
 
 
 Richard Coughtrie Gloucestershire Profile

1988 births
Living people
Sportspeople from North Shields
Cricketers from Tyne and Wear
Alumni of Oxford Brookes University
English cricketers
Northumberland cricketers
Oxford MCCU cricketers
Gloucestershire cricketers
Wicket-keepers